Svitávka is a market town in Blansko District in the South Moravian Region of the Czech Republic. It has about 1,800 inhabitants.

Administrative parts
The village of Sasina is an administrative part of Svitávka.

History
The area was populated already in the stone age. The first written mention is from 
1284, when King Wenceslaus II of Bohemia approved fortification. In 1583, Rudolf II promoted the village to a market town.

References

Populated places in Blansko District
Market towns in the Czech Republic